The 2000 Northeast Conference men's basketball tournament was held in March. The tournament featured the league's top eight seeds. Central Connecticut won the championship, its first, and received the conference's automatic bid to the 2000 NCAA Tournament.

Format
The NEC Men’s Basketball Tournament consisted of an eight-team playoff format with all games played at Sovereign Bank Arena in Trenton, NJ.

Bracket

All-tournament team
Tournament MVP in bold.

References

Northeast Conference men's basketball tournament
Tournament
Northeast Conference men's basketball tournament